Goronwy Owen Goronwy-Roberts, Baron Goronwy-Roberts, FRSA PC (20 September 1913 – 23 July 1981), was a Welsh Labour Member of Parliament.

Early life
Roberts was the younger son of Edward and Amelia Roberts from Bethesda, Gwynedd, where his father was an elder of the Presbyterian Church of Wales. He was educated at Ogwen Grammar School, Bethesda and the University College of North Wales, Bangor (now Bangor University). Later he attended  the University of London and was appointed a Fellow of the University of Wales in 1938. While at Bangor, Roberts, together with Harri Gwynn was one of the founders of Mudiad Gwerin, a nationalist left-wing pressure group.

Roberts served in the army in 1940-41 and in the army reserve until 1944. From 1941 until 1944 he worked as Youth Education Officer for Caernarfonshire and in 1944 was appointed lecturer in youth leadership at the University College of Swansea.

Member of Parliament
Goronwy Roberts was elected Labour MP for Caernarvonshire in 1945, when he defeated the sitting Liberal MP Goronwy Owen, who had held the seat since 1923. Following boundary changes, he was elected to represent Caernarvon at the 1950 General Election, defeating the Liberal candidate by over 10,000 votes. He continued to represent the constituency until  February 1974, when he lost his seat to Dafydd Wigley of Plaid Cymru.

During the 1950s, Roberts was, together with Cledwyn Hughes and others, a stalwart of the Parliament for Wales campaign. In 1951, Plaid Cymru announced that the party would not oppose him at the General Election due to his support for the campaign. Eventually, he presented the final petition to Parliament, bearing more than 250,000 signatures, in May 1956.

He was a member of the House of Commons Chairmen's Panel in 1963–64, and served in government as Minister of State at the Welsh Office from 1964 to 1966, Minister of State at the Department for Education and Science from 1966 to 1967, Minister of State for Foreign and Commonwealth Affairs 1967–69, and Minister of State for Trade 1969–70. When Labour lost power in 1970, Roberts became an opposition spokesman on Foreign and Commonwealth Affairs.

He was appointed a Privy Counsellor in 1968.

House of Lords and later life
On his defeat at the February General election in 1974 he was created a life peer as Baron Goronwy-Roberts, of Caernarfon and of Ogwen in the County of Caernarfonshire. He returned to government as Parliamentary Under-Secretary of State for Foreign and Commonwealth Affairs 1974-75 and as Minister of State for Foreign and Commonwealth Affairs 1975–79. He was Deputy Leader of the House of Lords, 1975–79.

Personal life
Roberts was a Member of the Court of Governors of the National Library of Wales, the National Museum of Wales and the University College of Wales, Aberystwyth (now Aberystwyth University). He was Chairman of the Welsh publishing house, Hughes a'i fab, from 1955 to 1959. He was appointed a FRSA in 1968 and an Honorary Freeman of the Royal Borough of Caernarfon in 1972.

In 1942 Roberts married Marian Ann Evans, daughter of David and Elizabeth Evans of Robertstown, Aberdare. They had two children: a daughter, Ann, and a son, Dafydd. Marion Goronwy-Roberts wrote a biography of Marion Phillips, the pioneering Labour campaigner for women's rights, and a number of books in Welsh, including the centenary lecture at the 1981 Welsh National Eisteddfod on the Welsh poet, scholar and politician, W. J. Gruffydd.

Assessment
Goronwy Roberts was a strong supporter of devolution and of Welsh culture but was also a fierce critic of what he regarded as the nationalistic excess of Plaid Cymru. His own roots were in the Labour tradition of the quarry working communities of his constituency. His Welsh was fluent and attractive ("swynol, dawel, gerddorol"). He was greatly troubled by his defeat at the General Election of 1974.

References

Sources

Books and Journals

Online

Other
Times Guide to the House of Commons February 1974
Who Was Who

External links 

1913 births
1981 deaths
People from Gwynedd
Members of the Privy Council of the United Kingdom
Alumni of the University of London
Alumni of the University of Wales
People associated with Aberystwyth University
Members of Parliament for Caernarfon
Welsh Labour Party MPs
UK MPs 1945–1950
UK MPs 1950–1951
UK MPs 1951–1955
UK MPs 1955–1959
UK MPs 1959–1964
UK MPs 1964–1966
UK MPs 1966–1970
UK MPs 1970–1974
Ministers in the Wilson governments, 1964–1970
Goronwy-Roberts
UK MPs who were granted peerages
Life peers created by Elizabeth II